Aaron's Party: The Videos is pop musician Aaron Carter's first music video DVD with videos from his then-recent album, Aaron's Party (Come Get It). It was released in 2000, the month after the release of the corresponding album.  The video peaked at #7 at US Billboard Top Music Video Charts. The DVD was certified Platinum by RIAA on December 1, 2000.

Videos
"Aaron's Party Come Get It"- 3:24
"I Want Candy"- 3:13
"Bounce"- 3:19
"Iko Iko"- 2:41
"The Clapping Song"- 2:58

Certifications and sales

References

2000 video albums
2000 compilation albums
Music video compilation albums
Aaron Carter video albums